Danoceras is an essentially straight shelled oncocerid named by Troedsson in 1926, and included in the Diestoceratidae. It has been found in the upper, and possibly middle, Ordovician of Europe, (Estonia), Greenland, and Russia, (Taimyr Peninsula). Named species include Danoceras ravni, type, D. inutile, D. scandinavicum, and D. skalbergensis.

The Danoceras shell is oval in section, laterally compressed with broadly rounded sides and narrowly rounded dorsum and venter. Chambers are short, septa close spaced, sutures straight and transverse. The siphuncle is subventral, close to but not touching the ventral margin. In form, cyrtochoanitic, necks recumbant.

Related genera include Diestoceras, Dowlingoceras, Lychholmoceras, and Suttonoceras.

References
 Walter C Sweet, 1964.  Nautiloidea - Oncocerida. Treatise on Invertebrate Paleontology. Geological Society of America and University of Kansas Press.

Oncocerida
Prehistoric nautiloid genera
Ordovician cephalopods
Fossils of Greenland
Middle Ordovician first appearances
Late Ordovician extinctions
Paleozoic life of Ontario
Paleozoic life of Quebec